Williams River may refer to:

Australia
 Williams River (New South Wales)
 Williams River (Queensland)
 Williams River (Western Australia)

United States
 Williams River (Housatonic River), a tributary of the Housatonic River in western Massachusetts
 Williams River (Oregon)
 Williams River (Vermont)
 Williams River (West Virginia)
 Bill Williams River, in Arizona